Samuel Shepheard may refer to:
 Samuel Shepheard (died 1719), Member of Parliament for Newport (Isle of Wight) and the City of London
 Samuel Shepheard (died 1748), his son, Member of Parliament for Malmesbury, Cambridge and Cambridgeshire

See also
 Samuel Shepherd (disambiguation)